Harry Griffiths (born 1 February 1886) was an English footballer who played as a defender.

External links
 LFC History profile

1886 births
English footballers
Liverpool F.C. players
Date of death missing
1933 deaths
Chesterfield F.C. players
Partick Thistle F.C. players
Association football fullbacks
Footballers from Middlesbrough